Garangah (also Romanized as Garangāh; also known as Karamgāh and Karangāh) is a village in Bozkosh Rural District, in the Central District of Ahar County, East Azerbaijan Province, Iran. In the 2006 census, its population was 400, in 89 families.

References 

Populated places in Ahar County